Coelossia is a genus of African orb-weaver spiders first described by Eugène Simon in 1895.  it contains only two species.

References

Araneidae
Araneomorphae genera
Spiders of Africa
Taxa named by Eugène Simon